Eriastrum diffusum is a species of flowering plant in the phlox family known by the common name miniature woollystar. It is native to the southwestern United States from California to Texas, where it grows in many types of open habitat. This is an annual herb producing a thin, usually woolly stem up to about 20 centimeters long, growing erect or spreading outward. The leaves are divided into 2 to 4 narrow, threadlike linear lobes. The inflorescence is a woolly cluster of narrow, leaflike bracts laced with webby fibers. The small flowers are funnel-shaped, with yellowish throats and white to pale blue corollas.

External links
Jepson Manual Treatment
Photo gallery

diffusum
Flora of the Southwestern United States